Paraguay is a country in South America, bordering Brazil, Argentina and Bolivia. The Paraguay River (Spanish: Río Paraguay) divides the country into strikingly different eastern and western regions. Both the eastern region (officially called Eastern Paraguay, Paraguay Oriental, and known as the Paraneña region) and the western region (officially Western Paraguay, Paraguay Occidental, and known as the Chaco) gently slope toward and are drained into the Paraguay River, which separates and unifies the two regions. With the Paraneña region reaching southward and the Chaco extending to the north, Paraguay straddles the Tropic of Capricorn and experiences both subtropical and tropical climates.

Borders

Paraguay borders on three substantially larger countries: Bolivia, Brazil, and Argentina. The country has three tripoints: Argentina-Bolivia-Paraguay, Bolivia-Brazil-Paraguay and Paraguay-Argentina-Brazil. The definition of the northwestern boundary with Bolivia, extending through the low hills of the Chaco region, dates from 1938. The boundary between the Chaco and Brazil was defined in 1927; it continues from the confluence of the Apa River (Río Apa) and Paraguay River northward along the course of the Paraguay River to the border with Bolivia. The northern border of the Paraneña region, set in 1872, follows the course of the Paraná River (Río Paraná), the ridges of the mountains in the northeast region, and finally the course of the Apa River until it empties into the Paraguay River. The large Argentina–Paraguay border comprises the Pilcomayo River (Río Pilcomayo), Paraná River, and Paraguay River. Argentina and Paraguay agreed on these boundaries in 1876.

Natural regions

Paraguay contains six terrestrial ecoregions: Alto Paraná Atlantic forests, Chaco, Cerrado, Humid Chaco, Pantanal, and Paraná flooded savanna which fall into two main natural regions, divided by the Paraguay River: the Paraneña region (a mixture of plateaus, rolling hills, and valleys) and the Chaco region (an immense piedmont plain).

About 95 percent of Paraguay's population resides in the Paraneña region, which has all the significant orographic features and a more predictable climate. The Paraneña region can be generally described as consisting of an area of highlands in the east that slopes toward the Río Paraguay and becomes an area of lowlands, subject to floods, along the river.

The Chaco consists predominantly of lowlands, also inclined toward the Río Paraguay, that are alternately flooded and parched.

The Eastern Region: Paraneña
The Eastern region extends from the Río Paraguay eastward to the Río Paraná, which forms the border with Brazil and Argentina. The eastern hills and mountains, an extension of a plateau in southern Brazil, dominate the region. The Eastern region also has spacious plains, broad valleys, and lowlands. About 80% of the region lies below  in elevation; the lowest elevation, occurs in the extreme south at the confluence of the Río Paraguay and Río Paraná. 

The Eastern region is drained primarily by rivers that flow westward to the Río Paraguay, although some rivers flow eastward to the Río Paraná. Low-lying meadows, subject to floods, separate the eastern mountains from the Río Paraguay.

The Eastern region as a whole naturally divides into five physiographic subregions:

 the Paraná Plateau
 the Northern Upland
 the Central Hill Belt
 the Central Lowland
 the Ñeembucú Plain

In the east, the heavily wooded Paraná Plateau occupies one-third of the region and extends its full length from north to south and up to  westward from the Brazilian and Argentine borders. The plateau slopes moderately to east and south, its remarkably uniform surface interrupted only by the narrow valleys carved by the westward-flowing tributaries of the Río Paraná.

The Northern Upland, the Central Hill Belt, and the Central Lowland constitute the lower terrain lying between the escarpment and the Río Paraguay. The first of these eroded extensions stretching westward of the Paraná Plateau—the Northern Upland—occupies the portion northward from the Aquidabán River (Río Aquidabán) to the Apa River on the Brazilian border. The Central Hill Belt encompasses the area in the vicinity of Asunción. Although nearly flat surfaces occur in this subregion, the rolling terrain is extremely uneven. Small, isolated peaks are numerous, and it is here that the only lakes of any size are found. Between these two upland subregions lies the Central Lowland, an area of low elevation and relief, sloping gently upward from the Río Paraguay toward the Paraná Plateau. The valleys of the Central Lowland's westward-flowing rivers are broad and shallow, and periodic flooding of their courses creates seasonal swamps. This subregion's most conspicuous features, its flat-topped hills, project  from the grassy plain. Thickly forested, these hills cover areas ranging from a hectare to several square kilometers (acres to square miles). Apparently the weathered remnants of rock related to geological formations farther to the east, these hills are called islas de monte (mountain islands), and their margins are known as costas (coasts).

The remaining subregion—the Ñeembucú Plain—lies in the southwest corner of the Paraneña region. This alluvial flatland has a slight westerly-southwesterly slope obscured by gentle undulations. The Tebicuary River (Río Tebicuary)—a major tributary of the Río Paraguay – bisects the swampy lowland, which is broken in its central portion by rounded swells of land up to three meters in height.

The main orographic features of the Paraneña region include the Cordillera de Amambay, the Cordillera de Mbaracayú, and the Cordillera de Caaguazú. The Cordillera de Amambay extends from the northeast corner of the region south and slightly east along the Brazilian border.

The Cordillera de Amambay merges with the Cordillera de Mbaracayú, which reaches eastward  to the Río Paraná. The Río Paraná forms the Salto del Guairá waterfall where it cuts through the mountains of the Cordillera de Mbaracayú to enter Argentina.

This chain is not a continuous massif but is interrupted by hills and undulations covered with forests and meadows. The Cordillera de Caaguazú reaches westward from the Paraná Plateau into the Central Hill Belt.

A lesser mountain chain, the Serranía de Mbaracayú, also rises at the point where the Cordillera de Amambay and Cordillera de Mbaracayú meet.

The Western Region (Chaco)
  

Covering more than 60 percent of Paraguay's total land area, the Chaco plain slopes gently eastward to the Río Paraguay.

The Paraguayan Chaco is subdivided into two parts. The Alto Chaco (Upper Chaco), also called Chaco Seco (Dry Chaco) is the western three-quarters of the region, bordering on Bolivia, while the Bajo Chaco (Lower Chaco) or Chaco Húmedo (Humid Chaco) borders on the Paraguay River. The low hills in the northwestern part of the Alto Chaco are the highest parts in the Gran Chaco. One prominent wetland of the Bajo Chaco is the Estero Patiño, which at  forms the largest swamp in the country.

The very pronounced dry season lasts from May to October, and a wet season occurs from November to April, when the vegetation turns green and abundant.

The soils of the Chaco are very deep sedimentary soils rich in nutrients, including luvisols, cambisols, and regosols, and are in general very fertile and apt for agriculture and pasture (always presuming responsible and sustainable techniques), more so than most of the world's semi-arid tropics. Limiting factors include a lack of ground freshwater in most of the Paraguay's Chaco, except in the north and the west. The lowlands facing the Paraguay River have insufficient drainage and seasonal flooding (which again increases soil fertility) as a constraint.

Drainage

The word Paraguay can be translated as the Paradise of Waters, as there's plently to be found all around the country, inclunding underneath it; see Guarani Aquifer. The Paraguay River has a total course of 2600 km, 2300 km of which are navigable and 1200 km of which either border on or pass through Paraguay. During most years vessels with 21 m drafts can reach Concepción without difficulty. Medium-sized ocean vessels can sometimes reach Asunción, but the twisting meanders and shifting sandbars can make this transit difficult. Although sluggish and shallow, the river sometimes overflows its low banks, forming temporary swamps and flooding villages. River islands, meander scars, and oxbow (U-shaped) lakes attest to frequent changes in course.

The major tributaries entering the Paraguay River from the Paraneña region—such as the Apa, Aquidabán, and Tebicuary Rivers—descend rapidly from their sources in the Paraná Plateau to the lower lands. There they broaden and become sluggish as they meander westward. After heavy rains these rivers sometimes flood nearby lowlands.

About 4700 km long, the Paraná River is the second major river in the country. From Salto del Guairá, where the former Guairá Falls were located, the river enters Paraguay and flows 800 km to its juncture with the Paraguay River and then continues southward to the Río de la Plata Estuary at Buenos Aires, Argentina. In general, the Río Paraná is navigable by large ships only up to Encarnación in Southern Paraguay but smaller boats may go somewhat further north. In summer months the river is deep enough to permit vessels with drafts of up to three meters to reach Salto del Guairá, but seasonal and other occasional conditions severely limit the river's navigational value. On the upper course, sudden floods may raise the water level by as much as five meters in twenty-four hours; west of Encarnación, however, the rocks of the riverbed sometimes come within one meter of the surface during winter and effectively sever communication between the upper river and Buenos Aires.

The rivers flowing eastward across the Paraneña region as tributaries of the Paraná River are shorter, faster-flowing, and narrower than the tributaries of the Paraguay River, except the Iguazu River at the Iguazu Falls. Sixteen of these rivers and numerous smaller streams enter the Paraná River above Encarnación.

Paraguay's third largest river, the Pilcomayo River, flows into the Paraguay River near Asunción after demarcating the entire border between the Chaco region and Argentina. During most of its course, the river is sluggish and marshy, although small craft can navigate its lower reaches. When the Pilcomayo River overflows its low banks, it feeds the Patiño Estuary (Estero Patiño).

Drainage in the Chaco region is generally poor because of the flatness of the land and the small number of important streams. In many parts of the region, the water table is only a meter beneath the surface of the ground, and there are numerous small ponds and seasonal marshes. As a consequence of the poor drainage, most of the water is too salty for drinking or irrigation.

Because of the seasonal overflow of the numerous westward-flowing streams, the lowland areas of the Paraneña region also experience poor drainage conditions, particularly in the Ñeembucú Plain in the southwest, where an almost impervious clay subsurface prevents the absorption of excess surface water into the aquifer. About 30 percent of the Paraneña region is flooded from time to time, creating extensive areas of seasonal marshlands. Permanent bogs are found only near the largest geographic depressions, however.

Climate

Paraguay experiences a subtropical climate in the Paraneña region and a tropical climate in the Chaco. The Paraneña region has a humid climate, with abundant precipitation throughout the year and only moderate seasonal changes in temperature. During the Southern Hemisphere's summer, which corresponds to the northern winter, the dominant influence on the climate is the warm sirocco winds blowing out of the northeast. During the winter, the dominant wind is the cold pampero from the South Atlantic, which blows across Argentina and is deflected northeastward by the Andes in the southern part of that country. Because of the lack of topographic barriers within Paraguay, these opposite prevailing winds bring about abrupt and irregular changes in the usually moderate weather. Winds are generally brisk. Velocities of 160 km/h (100 mph) have been reported in southern locations, and the town of Encarnación was once leveled by a tornado.

The Paraneña region has only two distinct seasons: summer from October to March and winter from May to August. April and September are transitional months in which temperatures are below the midsummer averages and minimums may dip below freezing. Climatically, autumn and spring do not really exist. There is no significant north-south variation. The number of days with temperatures falling below freezing ranges from as few as three to as many as sixteen yearly, and with even wider variations deep in the interior. Some winters are very mild, with winds blowing constantly from the north, and little frost. During a cold winter, however, tongues of Antarctic air bring subfreezing temperatures to all areas. No part of the Paraneña region is entirely free from the possibility of frost and consequent damage to crops, and snow flurries have been reported in various locations.

Moist tropical air keeps the weather warm in the Paraneña region from October through March. During the summer, daytime temperatures reaching  are fairly common. Frequent waves of cool air from the south, however, cause weather that alternates between clear, humid conditions and storms. Skies will be almost cloudless for a week to ten days as temperature and humidity rise continually.

Rainfall in the Paraneña region is fairly evenly distributed. Although local meteorological conditions play a contributing role, rain usually falls when tropical air masses are dominant. The two periods of maximum precipitation are March through May and October to November.

All subregions may experience considerable variations from year to year.

In contrast to the Paraneña region, the Chaco has a tropical wet-and-dry climate bordering on semi-arid. The Chaco experiences seasons that alternately flood and parch the land, yet seasonal variations in temperature are modest. Chaco temperatures are usually high, the averages dropping only slightly in winter. Even at night the air is stifling despite the usually present breezes. Rainfall is concentrated in the summer months, and extensive areas that are deserts in winter become summer swamps.

Examples

Environment

Current environmental issues include deforestation (Paraguay lost an estimated 20,000 km2 of forest land between 1958 and 1985) and water pollution (inadequate means for waste disposal present health risks for many urban residents). Paraguay is a party to the United Nations Framework Convention on Climate Change, the Climate Change-Kyoto Protocol, the Law of the Sea, and the Ozone Layer Protection. It has also signed, but not ratified, the Nuclear Test Ban.

Statistics
Geographic coordinates: 

Area:
total:
406,750 km2
land:
397,300 km2
water:
9,450 km2

Land boundaries:
total:
3,920 km
border countries:
Argentina 1,880 km, Bolivia 750 km, Brazil 1,290 km

Coastline:
0 km (landlocked)

Elevation extremes:
lowest point:
junction of Rio Paraguay and Rio Paraná 46 m
highest point:
Cerro Peró 842 m

Land use:
arable land:
6%
permanent crops:
0%
permanent pastures:
55%
forests and woodland:
32%
other:
7% (1993 est.)

Irrigated land:
670 km2 (1993 est.)

Extreme points 

This is a list of the extreme points of Paraguay, the points that are farther north, south, east or west than any other location.

 Northernmost point – the Hito VII Fortin Coronel Sanchez pillar on the border with Bolivia, Alto Paraguay Department
 Easternmost point – unnamed headland in the Itaipu reservoir near the town of Álvar Núñez Cabeza de Vaca, Canindeyú Department
 Southernmost point (including islands) – unnamed island south of Isla Talavera in the Rio Paraná, Itapúa Department
 Southernmost point (mainland only) – unnamed headland southeast of the town of Cambyretá and immediately north of the Argentinian town of Candelaria, Itapúa Department
 Westernmost point – the Hito I Esmeralda pillar on the border with Argentina, Boquerón department
 Highest point – Cerro Tres Kandú, Guairá Department, 842 m
 Lowest point – junction of Rio Paraguay and Rio Parana, 46 m
 Geographic center – 133 km west of Concepción

See also
 Paraguay
 List of cities in Paraguay

References

External links
Paraguay, or the Province of the Rio de la Plata, with the Adjacent Regions Tucamen and Santa Cruz de la Sierra is a map from 1616 of Paraguay and the surrounding area.

 
 Regions of Paraguay